Neactaeonina is a genus of small sea snails, predatory marine gastropod molluscs in the family Acteonidae, the barrel bubble snails.

Species
Species within the genus Neacteonina include:
 Neactaeonina cingulata Strebel, 1908 - Distribution: subantarctic. Length: 10.5 mm. Description: found at depths of 50 to 350 m.
 Neactaeonina edentula Watson, 1883 - Distribution: subantarctic, Indian Ocean, Kerguelen Islands. Length: 49.6 mm. Description: found at depths of 170 to 800 m.
 Neactaeonina inexpectata Dell, 1956
 Neactaeonina umbilicalis

References

Further reading
 Powell A W B, William Collins Publishers Ltd, Auckland 1979 

Acteonidae